A nonreturner is a person who did not return to some initial destination point, or to previous way of life, etc.

 Never-returners, a group of noble disciples (Buddhist Sekhas) on the Buddhist path.
 Nonreturnees, a slang term for Soviet citizen who refused to come back to USSR from the trips abroad.